Christina Ochoa (born Cristina Ochoa Lopez, 25 January 1985 in Barcelona) is a Spanish actress, science communicator, and producer.

Early life
Ochoa is the grand-niece of 1959 Nobel Prize winner Severo Ochoa, and the daughter of acclaimed Spanish sculptor Victor Ochoa. She has spent her life surrounded by members of both the scientific and artistic worlds.

Theatre and film
Ochoa began acting as a hobby, starting in theatrical plays in Washington, D.C., at the Little Theatre of Alexandria.

She soon decided to pursue a career in performance arts, and moved to Madrid to study and work in the field. She has said: "Science was all my life .... But when I got on stage for the first time, there was a void inside me that was suddenly filled ... one I hadn't even known was empty".

From there, Ochoa moved on to work in theatre and TV, including on I Hate My Teenage Daughter, Modern Family and Spain's La que se avecina, as well as in films, including Cats Dancing on Jupiter.

She is the founder and owner of QE (Quantum Entanglement) Productions, responsible for the 2011 short film Stay with Me, which won awards at film festivals both internationally and in the United States.

In 2014, Ochoa played Karen Morales on the Robert Rodríguez show, Matador.

She has portrayed Renn on the TNT drama Animal Kingdom since 2016.

In 2017 she became the female lead of NBC Universal and Syfy series Blood Drive.

On 20 February 2018, Ochoa played Ashley Morales in the ABC drama series A Million Little Things before the series ordered in May 2018. Ochoa exited the series after one season and 13 episodes in first season episode, "Twelve Seconds" on 31 January 2019.

Writing
Ochoa has written articles for several publications. Her first published work was featured in Vogue Spain. She has regular spreads featured in H, in which she focuses on profile pieces and book reviews. She also has a monthly film column in El Imparcial.

Science communication and academia
Ochoa is on the advisory board for OCEANA and Earths Oceans. She is the host of the Know Brainer podcast, and has been the host and keynote of several scientific conferences and shows including the college prep program MESA, Bitesize TV's Chaotic Awesome, and NERD ALERT on The Young Turks network.

She is part of the Los Angeles Committee for Science for Society, which promotes science in society and scientific literacy, and which is the sponsor of the Intel Science and Engineering Fair (ISEF). She served as commentator for ISEF 2017.

She has been an active member of Mensa since 2009.

After graduating from Santa Isabel La Asunción in Madrid, she began an undergraduate degree in oceanographic engineering at Universidad de las Palmas de Gran Canaria, off the coast of Africa in the Canary Islands.

She continued with advanced marine biology studies at James Cook University in Australia, where she focused on Elasmobranchii, subclass which includes sharks and rays.
  
She also enrolled in additional subjects in particle physics at the Universidad Nacional de Educacion a Distancia (UNED) but merged into full-time acting before she could complete her masters.

She has also participated as an expert guest on the scientific comedy podcast Professor Blastoff, part of the Earwolf network; Cara Santa Maria's Talk Nerdy; and several online STEM education platforms.

Personal life
Christina Ochoa was in a relationship with Nathan Fillion (Firefly) between the years of 2013–2015.

Selected filmography

References

External links

 
 
 El Imparcial homepage
 Know Brainer

Living people
1985 births
Spanish marine biologists
Spanish stage actresses
Spanish film actresses
Spanish television actresses
Actresses from Barcelona
University of Las Palmas de Gran Canaria alumni
James Cook University alumni
Mensans
Spanish women writers
Writers from Barcelona
Spanish people of Asturian descent